Alex O'Brien and Sandon Stolle were the defending champions, but lost in second round to Mark Knowles and Daniel Nestor.

Todd Woodbridge and Mark Woodforde won the title. They were leading 6–2, 3–0 to Mark Knowles and Daniel Nestor until the latter were forced to retire.

Seeds
The first four seeds received a bye into the second round.

Draw

Finals

Top half

Bottom half

References
 Official Results Archive (ATP)
 Official Results Archive (ITF)

Doubles